Comet Hopper (CHopper) was a proposed lander to NASA's Discovery Program that, had it been selected, would have orbited and landed multiple times on Comet Wirtanen as it approached the Sun. The proposed mission was led by Jessica Sunshine of the UMD, working with Lockheed Martin to build the spacecraft and the NASA Goddard Spaceflight Center to manage the mission.

History
The Comet Hopper mission was one of three Discovery Program finalists that received  million in May 2011 to develop a detailed concept study.

The other two missions were InSight and Titan Mare Explorer. After a review in August 2012, NASA selected the InSight mission.

Scientific goals 
The CHopper mission had three primary science goals for the 7.3 years of its lifetime. At roughly 4.5 AU the spacecraft would have rendezvoused with Comet Wirtanen to map the spatial heterogeneity of surface solids as well as gas and dust emissions from the coma - the nebulous envelope around the nucleus of a comet. The remote mapping would also allow for any nucleus structure, geologic processes, and coma mechanisms to be determined. After arriving at Comet Wirtanen, the spacecraft would have approached and landed, then subsequently hopped to other locations on the comet. As the comet approached the sun, the spacecraft would land and hop multiple times to record surface changes as the comet became more active. The final landing would occur at 1.5 AU.

See also

 Champollion (spacecraft)
 Mars Geyser Hopper
 Rosetta (spacecraft)
Triton Hopper

References

External links 
Press Releases
 NASA Goddard Managed Comet Hopper Mission Selected for Further Study
 Comet Hopper, a UMD/NASA Goddard Proposal, Moves to 'Final Round' in NASA Selection Process
News Articles
 Maryland scientists vie for NASA missions

Cancelled spacecraft
Missions to comets
Advanced Stirling radioisotope generator
Discovery program proposals
Hopping spacecraft